R-DF13, which is also known as R-S521, R-Z2542 and R-CTS8221, as well as the phylogenetic name R1b1a1a2a1a2c1a, is a human Y-chromosome DNA haplogroup, which is characteristic of a majority of the living male inhabitants of Ireland, Scotland, Wales and Brittany.

Origin 

R-DF13, which originated approximately 4,200 years ago, is a primary subclade of R-L21. It is likely associated with the Bell Beaker culture and, possibly, the Celts.

This haplogroup is found among an absolute majority of the male inhabitants of Ireland, Scotland, Wales and Brittany; is also found at significant levels in England,  northern France, and north-west Iberia (Northern Portugal, Galicia and Asturias). It is found at lower levels in Belgium and the Netherlands.

DF13 is ancestral to many subclades commonly found in the above areas, including: R-L513/S215/DF1, R-L1335, R-Z253, R-ZZ10, R-Z251, R-Z255/S219, R-FGC33712, R-FGC59881 and R-FGC33755.

References 

Celts
Genetics in the United Kingdom
R
R